James Clarke Satterthwaite (1746–1825) was a British politician who sat in the House of Commons during the late 18th and early 19th centuries.

Satterthwaite was a placeman for James Lowther, 1st Earl of Lonsdale. He died on 1 May 1825.

References

1746 births
1825 deaths
Cumbria MPs
Members of the Parliament of Great Britain for English constituencies
Members of the Parliament of the United Kingdom for English constituencies
British MPs 1796–1800
British MPs 1790–1796
British MPs 1784–1790
UK MPs 1801–1802
Members of the Parliament of Great Britain for Carlisle